The Arkansas Democrat-Gazette is the newspaper of record in the U.S. state of Arkansas, printed in Little Rock with a northwest edition published in Lowell. It is distributed for sale in all 75 of Arkansas' counties.

By virtue of one of its predecessors, the Arkansas Gazette (founded in 1819), it claims to be the oldest continuously published newspaper west of the Mississippi River. The original print shop of the Gazette is preserved at the Historic Arkansas Museum in Little Rock.

History

Early years
The history of the Arkansas Democrat-Gazette goes back to the earliest days of territorial Arkansas. William E. Woodruff arrived at the territorial capital at Arkansas Post in late 1819 on a dugout canoe with a second-hand wooden press. He cranked out the first edition of the Arkansas Gazette on November 20, 1819, 17 years before Arkansas became a state. Early in its history the Gazette scrupulously avoided political involvement or endorsement.

In 1821 the territorial capital was moved to Little Rock, and Woodruff moved his Gazette along with it.  The Gazette led the campaign for Arkansas statehood which was accomplished in 1836 and constantly promoted new immigration to the state.

The Gazette supported Texas independence and called for volunteers from Arkansas to assist the Texans and supported the Mexican–American War. In the 1840s Woodruff lost control of the paper and established a competing paper, the Arkansas Democrat (not related to the later Democrat).

In 1850, after the Gazette had briefly failed under its new owners, Woodruff regained control and combined it with his Democrat as the Arkansas State Gazette and Democrat. Later in the 1850s, under another owner, the name was shortened to the Arkansas State Gazette.

Civil War era
The Gazette struggled through the early Civil War years facing financial problems and shortages of supplies.  The Gazette had initially been pro-Union but altered its position after Lincoln's call for troops, much like Arkansas as a whole.

In 1863 Little Rock fell to Union troops and the Gazette suspended publication until May 1865 while Federal authorities used the presses for their own publications.

Competition after the Civil War
During the Reconstruction years a competitor arose called by a variety of names, under a variety of editors, and with several different owners.  In 1878 J.N. Smithee bought the newspaper, changed its name to the Arkansas Democrat, and went after lucrative state printing contracts held by the Gazette.

The Gazette and the Democrat engaged in a war of words that soon escalated into an exchange of gunfire between the owner of the Democrat and a part-owner of the Gazette.

Over the years the Gazette and the Democrat supported opposing candidates and took opposite editorial positions.  Throughout the simmering battle the Gazette continued to be the dominant state newspaper.  The Gazette was owned and edited by John Netherland Heiskell who guided it with a firm hand through most of the 20th century.

In 1926, August Engel acquired a major interest in the Democrat. He became the newspaper's president and general manager, leading it through a period of great growth over the next 43 years. Engel gained a reputation as a hard-working, shrewd businessman who took an active part in the editorial process.

Central High crisis
The Gazette took a strong editorial stance against Governor Orval Faubus when he tried to prevent the Little Rock Nine from integrating Little Rock Central High School in 1957. In 1958 the Gazette was awarded the Pulitzer Prize for Public Service for its stand, and executive editor Harry Ashmore won the Pulitzer Prize for Editorial Writing. This was the first time in history that a newspaper won two Pulitzer Prizes within the same year. Despite its honors the circulation of the Gazette dropped during the crisis due to boycotts, which ended when Ashmore left the paper.

The Democrat charted a generally neutral editorial stand. Its photographer Will Counts took several important pictures of the crisis, including a famous picture of Elizabeth Eckford, one of the Nine, being shouted at by an angry white girl, later identified as Hazel Massery; the Associated Press declared it to be one of the top 100 photos of the 20th century.  Counts also helped arrange the public reconciliation of Eckford and Massery in 1997.

Counts' work submitted by the Arkansas Democrat for the 1958 Pulitzer Prize, received the unanimous recommendation of the Pulitzer jurors for Best Spot News Photography. However, Counts was denied the award when the Pulitzer board overruled its jurors and gave the award to another entrant which portrayed a different local police force as friendly to its citizens.

In 2005, the Democrat-Gazette editorial cartoonist, John Deering, and his wife Cathy created a bronze sculpture of the Nine, entitled Testament, on the grounds of the Arkansas State Capitol.

The newspaper war
Heiskell died in 1972, and his family continued to run the Gazette.
In 1974 the Democrat was sold to WEHCO Media Inc., owned by the Hussman family.  Walter E. Hussman Jr., 27, became the publisher. At the time of Hussman's arrival the morning Gazette was far in front of the afternoon Democrat, with daily circulation 118,702 to the Democrat's 62,405.  Hussman embarked on a campaign of major cost reductions and concentrating subscription effort on the Little Rock urban market.  These efforts had little success. By 1977 Hussman attempted to reach an agreement with the Gazette to combine operations but his overtures were rejected.

Hussman vigorously fought back and was intent on making the Democrat the state's largest newspaper.  A war ensued between the two papers.  The Democrat expanded its news operation, offered free classified advertisements, and switched from afternoon publication to morning publication.

In 1979 Hussman appointed John Robert Starr to the position of managing editor.  The fiery and irascible Starr temperament and intent in the upcoming circulation war was humorously illustrated by a cover story in the monthly magazine Arkansas Times  showing Starr squatting atop a Gazette newspaper box with a dagger between his teeth to show his seriousness.  Starr doubled the size of the news staff and concentrated on hard news.  Under Starr's direction readership increased steadily.  During 1980 the Democrat was the fastest growing newspaper in the United States.

The Gazette responded by hiring new staff, going to a color format, and filing a federal antitrust suit against the Democrat in 1984. The suit accused the Hussman enterprises of predatory practices and trying to harm the Gazette. The Democrat responded that it was only trying to gain market share to be more competitive with the larger and more dominant Arkansas Gazette.

A federal jury in the court of U.S. District Judge William R. Overton rendered its verdict on March 26, 1986. The Democrat was found not guilty of all the allegations leveled against it by the Gazette.

The Heiskell family sold the Arkansas Gazette to Gannett, the nation's largest newspaper chain, on December 1, 1986.

Gannett had immense assets with which to fight the Democrat. However, it received criticism for bringing in out-of-town reporters and staff and losing the paper's local feel.  The Gazette, nicknamed the "Old Lady", became flashier but critics complained that the paper had lost the respect of the readership.

Over the next five years the two newspapers dueled.  The circulation of the Gazette remained steady over that period of time, but the daily circulation of the Democrat went from 81,000 to 131,000 and the Sunday circulation leapt ahead of the Gazette'''s 218,000 to achieve 230,000.

Victory of the Democrat
The financial losses of the fiercely contested battle were too much for Gannett to justify.  On October 18, 1991 Gannett threw in the towel and sold the Gazette to WEHCO.  The first edition of the Arkansas Democrat-Gazette rolled off the presses the next morning, October 19.  Most Arkansans, regardless of which paper they subscribed to, were saddened by the sudden loss of their historic newspaper.

Many of the reporters and staff of the more liberal Gazette were thrown out of work and not picked up by the more conservative Democrat-Gazette.  Many of these former employees were bitter at Gannett for their management of the newspaper war and angry at the Democrat for achieving victory.  Many of the "Old Lady's" employees left for other markets while some who remained aided in converting the Arkansas Times from a magazine format to a tabloid newspaper in order to provide a more liberal weekly alternative to the dominant conservative paper.

In the years since, the Arkansas Democrat-Gazette has maintained a higher circulation than newspapers in similarly sized cities.  Many newspapers that defeated in-town rivals concentrated on reducing costs and reduced news coverage to meet their goals.  The Arkansas Democrat-Gazette has continued to balance quality goals with profitability.  Pulitzer Prize winner Paul Greenberg was appointed the Democrat-Gazette editorial page editor on April 29, 1992. Griffin Smith, a sixth-generation Arkansan, was appointed Executive Editor on June 23, 1992. Smith retired May 1, 2012. Managing editor David Bailey, who joined the paper in May 1993, took over leadership of the newsroom operation. Greenberg stepped down on August 1, 2015 and David Barham, who joined the paper in 2002, took over as editorial page editor.

Online
The Democrat-Gazette implemented a website paywall in 2002, before most other newspapers. The newspaper credits the strategy with helping it stem declines in circulation, where it has fared much better than the industry at large since that time. Most other newspapers which implemented paywalls later had been operating popular free-access websites for years, leading to reader backlash. The Economist noted that the strategy is aided by its "virtual monopoly" over news in the region.

Digital conversion
The Democrat-Gazett''e ended print delivery of its Monday-Saturday papers statewide throughout 2018 and 2019 and transitioned to a digital replica edition.  All subscribers were provided a new iPad to access the replica edition, as well as one-on-one instruction, training and technical assistance.  The Sunday paper remains in traditional, print circulation.

See also

 Gazette Building (Little Rock, Arkansas)

References

External links
 
 Northwest Arkansas edition 
 
 
 
 
Arkansas Blog: Arkansas Democrat-Gazette
Arkansas Media Watch: Arkansas Democrat-Gazette

Newspapers published in Arkansas
Pulitzer Prize-winning newspapers
Mass media in Little Rock, Arkansas
Daily newspapers published in the United States